Events from the year 1908 in Canada.

Incumbents

Crown 
 Monarch – Edward VII

Federal government 
 Governor General – Albert Grey, 4th Earl Grey 
 Prime Minister – Wilfrid Laurier
 Chief Justice – Charles Fitzpatrick (Quebec) 
 Parliament – 10th (until 17 September)

Provincial governments

Lieutenant governors 
Lieutenant Governor of Alberta – George Hedley Vicars Bulyea 
Lieutenant Governor of British Columbia – James Dunsmuir 
Lieutenant Governor of Manitoba – Daniel Hunter McMillan
Lieutenant Governor of New Brunswick – Lemuel John Tweedie 
Lieutenant Governor of Nova Scotia – Duncan Cameron Fraser  
Lieutenant Governor of Ontario – William Mortimer Clark (until September 22) then John Morison Gibson 
Lieutenant Governor of Prince Edward Island – Donald Alexander MacKinnon 
Lieutenant Governor of Quebec – Louis-Amable Jetté (until September 15) then Charles Alphonse Pantaléon Pelletier 
Lieutenant Governor of Saskatchewan – Amédée Forget

Premiers 
Premier of Alberta – Alexander Cameron Rutherford  
Premier of British Columbia – Richard McBride 
Premier of Manitoba – Rodmond Roblin 
Premier of New Brunswick – Clifford William Robinson (until March 24) then John Douglas Hazen
Premier of Nova Scotia – George Henry Murray 
Premier of Ontario – James Whitney  
Premier of Prince Edward Island – Arthur Peters (until January 29) then Francis Haszard (from February 1)
Premier of Quebec – Lomer Gouin 
Premier of Saskatchewan – Thomas Walter Scott

Territorial governments

Commissioners
 Commissioner of Yukon – Alexander Henderson 
 Gold Commissioner of Yukon – F.X. Gosselin 
 Commissioner of Northwest Territories – Frederick D. White

Events
January 2 – The Royal Canadian Mint opens.
January 29 – Arthur Peters, Premier of Prince Edward Island, dies in office
February 1 – F. L. Haszard becomes premier of Prince Edward Island.
 March 7 – The University of British Columbia is established by the British Columbia University Act.
March 24 – Sir John Douglas Hazen becomes premier of New Brunswick, replacing Clifford Robinson.
June 8 – In the Ontario election, Sir James Whitney's Conservatives win a second consecutive majority.
June 12 – Saskatchewan Government Telephones created.
August 2 – A fire in the Kootenay region kills 70.
August 14 – In the Saskatchewan election, Walter Scott's Liberals win a second consecutive majority.
September 23 – The University of Alberta opens.
October 26 – In the federal election, Sir Wilfrid Laurier's Liberals win a fourth consecutive majority.

Full date unknown
Anne of Green Gables is first published, having a great effect on Prince Edward Island.
The Opium and Narcotics Act is passed banning certain drugs in Canada.
The Grain Growers Guide is first published.
 The Child Labour Act of Ontario is passed.
Vancouver Courier first published.

Arts and literature
Lucy Maud Montgomery's Anne of Green Gables is published.

Births

January to June
January 1 – Clarence Dunlap, Chief of the Air Staff Royal Canadian Air Force (d. 2003)
January 22 – Sinclair Ross, banker and author (d.1996)

February 1 – Louis Rasminsky, third Governor of the Bank of Canada (d.1998)
February 7 – Lela Brooks, speed skater (d.1990)
February 10 – Jean Coulthard, composer and academic (d.2000)
March 5 – Colin Emerson Bennett, politician and lawyer (d. 1993)
March 24 – Carl Klinck, literary historian and academic (d. 1990)
April 7 – Percy Faith, band-leader, orchestrator and composer (d. 1976)
May 11 – Hide Hyodo Shimizu, Japanese-Canadian educator and activist (d. 1999)  
May 19 – Percy Williams, athlete (d. 1982)
May 26 – James Sinclair, politician, businessman and father of Margaret Sinclair, one-time wife of Prime Minister Pierre Trudeau, and grandfather of Justin Trudeau (d.1984)
May 28 – Léo Cadieux, politician (d.2005)
June 5 – Maxwell Meighen, financier (d.1992)
June 18 – Stanley Knowles, politician (d.1997)

July to December
July 11 
 Gérard Légaré, politician (d. 1997) 
 Yves Prévost, politician and lawyer (d. 1997)
September 20 – Ernest Manning, Premier of Alberta (d.1996)
October 18 – Alfred Henry Bence, politician and barrister (d.1977)
October 24 – John Tuzo Wilson, geophysicist and geologist (d. 1993)
October 31 – Muriel Duckworth, pacifist and social activist (d. 2009)  
November 3 – Bronko Nagurski, American football player (d. 1990)
November 10 – Charles Merritt, army officer and politician (d. 2000)
December 6 – Nicholas Goldschmidt, conductor, administrator and artistic director (d.2004)
December 13 – W. L. Morton, historian (d.1980)
December 23 – Yousuf Karsh, photographer (d.2002)

Deaths

January to June
January 6 – George Dixon, first Canadian-born boxing champion (b.1870)
January 13 – George Anthony Walkem, jurist and Premier of British Columbia (b.1834)
January 29 – Arthur Peters, Premier of Prince Edward Island (b.1854)
May 31 – Louis-Honoré Fréchette, politician and writer (b.1839)
June 14 – Frederick Stanley, 16th Earl of Derby, Governor General of Canada (b.1841)
June 24 – William Whiteway, Premier of Newfoundland (b.1828)

July to December
August 18 – Alfred Boyd, 1st Premier of Manitoba (b.1835)
September 7 – Joseph-Guillaume Bossé, politician and lawyer (b.1843)
October 30 – Thomas Greenway, 7th Premier of Manitoba (b.1838)
November 16 – Henri-Gustave Joly de Lotbinière, 4th Premier of Quebec and Lieutenant Governor of British Columbia (b.1829)
December 11 – Jean Blanchet, politician (b.1843)
December 25 – William McGuigan, politician and 10th Mayor of Vancouver (b.1853)

Historical documents
Mackenzie King and U.S. President Theodore Roosevelt discuss Japanese immigration

To get people from "countries whose climatic conditions promise a suitable class of settlers," Canada pays bonuses to agents

Testimonials for service Salvation Army provides for immigrants to Canada

Lecturer describes largely American and mostly male immigration to Canada

Cabinet doubles spending-money amount required of jobless, hostless immigrants

Visiting agricultural tour reports on Canadian wages and cost of living

Visiting agriculturalist thinks Maritimes agriculture has much unmet potential

Visiting agriculturalist says Quebec's new Macdonald College will shake up "the worst farmers in Canada"

Visiting agriculturalist finds splendid fruit-growing potential in BC's Kootenay and Okanagan valleys

Government horticulturist W.T. Macoun advocates growing stands of trees on farms despite older farmers' antipathy toward them

Speaker celebrates Quebec City tercentenary, praising founders and their spirit

Brandon College principal supports right to separate religious university education

Fort McMurray fur trader introduces visitors to her Indigenous friends

Alberta rustlers convicted, one for rustling and one for perjury (Note: anti-Mormon comments)

Edmonton Board of Trade's guide to road and pack trail route to Finlay River, B.C.

Midwife blows cayenne pepper into woman's nose to induce sneezing and quick delivery of baby

References 

 
Years of the 20th century in Canada
Canada
Canada